Leppington is a hamlet and former civil parish, now in the parish of Scrayingham, in the Ryedale district of North Yorkshire, England, and is  north-east from the centre of the city and county town of York. In 1931 the parish had a population of 74.

The nearest railway station is at Malton,  to the north.

At the north of Leppington is the Grade II listed 17th-century Leppington Grange Barn.

History 
Historically the hamlet was part of the East Riding of Yorkshire until 1974. Leppington in 1823 was in the Wapentake of Buckrose in the East Riding of Yorkshire.

Leppington was formerly a township and chapelry in the parish of Scrayingham, from 1866 Leppington was a civil parish in its own right, on 1 April 1935 the parish was abolished and merged with Scrayingham.

References 

Hamlets in North Yorkshire
Former civil parishes in North Yorkshire
Ryedale